The Saddle King is a 1921 American short silent Western film directed by Edward Laemmle and featuring Hoot Gibson.

Cast
 Hoot Gibson
 Charles Newton
 Dorothy Wood
 Jim Corey

See also
 Hoot Gibson filmography

External links
 

1921 films
1921 Western (genre) films
American silent short films
American black-and-white films
Films directed by Edward Laemmle
Silent American Western (genre) films
1920s American films